Bahrija Nuri Hadžić (4 March 1904 – 24 October 1993) was a Bosnian soprano and prima donna. Hadžić was one of four daughters of writer Osman Nuri Hadžić.

Hadžić performed in Richard Strauss's Salome (1931).  In 1937, she performed the title role in the premiere of Alban Berg's Lulu (performed in its incomplete state).

References

1904 births
1993 deaths
Singers from Sarajevo
Bosnia and Herzegovina opera singers
Operatic sopranos
Bosniaks of Bosnia and Herzegovina
Yugoslav women opera singers